Alum Creek is an unincorporated community in Delaware County, in the U.S. state of Ohio.

History
A post office called Alum Creek was established in 1838, and remained in operation until 1899. The community takes its name from nearby Alum Creek.

References

Unincorporated communities in Delaware County, Ohio
Unincorporated communities in Ohio